The Palm Treo 750 is a GSM/UMTS smartphone released on January 8, 2007.

Features
Communications
UMTS tri band: UMTS 850, UMTS 1900, UMTS 2100, HSDPA (with Windows Mobile 6 upgrade)
GSM / GPRS / EDGE quad band: GSM 850, GSM 900, GSM 1800, GSM 1900

Carriers
In the United States the Treo 750 is available with AT&T, or directly from Palm as an unlocked device. It is also available in:

 Singapore on StarHub and SingTel
 Philippines on Globe Telecom
 Italy on 3 Italia
 Austria on 3 Networks
 Netherlands on KPN
 Australia on Telstra and 3
 Canada on Rogers Wireless
 Mexico on Telcel
 UK on Vodafone UK (badged as 750v)
 Germany on Vodafone Deutschland (badged as 750v)
 Turkey on TURKCELL

References
 Palm Press Releases
 Palm Multi-Connector

External links
 Palm Treo 750 Review - CNET.com.au
Treo 750 featured in PCWorld.ca's round-up of Top Canadian Smartphones and Cell Phones

Windows Mobile Professional devices
Palm mobile phones
Palm Treo 750